Morton H. Fetterolf, Jr. (April 18, 1912 – November 4, 1997) was an American politician from Pennsylvania who served as a Republican member of the Pennsylvania House of Representatives for the Montgomery County district from 1957 to 1964 including as Majority Whip from 1963 to 1964.  He also served in the Pennsylvania State Senate for the 12th district in 1964. He was elected to the state senate on April 28, 1964 and resigned on July 2, 1964.

Early life and education
Fetterolf was born in Rydal, Pennsylvania and attended the William Penn Charter School, The Hill School, and Yale University.

He served in the U.S. Navy during World War II from 1943 to 1946.

Business career
He worked as vice president and director of the Millfield Coal and Mining Company and as director of the Sugar Creek Coal and Mining Company.  He was a stock broker for Newburger and Company and owner of the Philadelphia Bulldogs, a professional football team.  He also served as executive vice-president of the Continental Football League.

He resigned the state senate in 1964 to join the stock brokerage firm Newburger & Company where he worked until retirement.

He died on November 4, 1997 and is interred at Saint Thomas' Episcopal Church Cemetery in Whitemarsh, Pennsylvania.

References

1912 births
1997 deaths
20th-century American politicians
United States Navy personnel of World War II
American sports owners
Burials in Pennsylvania
Republican Party members of the Pennsylvania House of Representatives
Republican Party Pennsylvania state senators
The Hill School alumni